Henri Millan (10 December 1903 – 8 October 1982) was a French cross-country skier. He competed in the men's 50 kilometre event at the 1928 Winter Olympics.

References

1903 births
1982 deaths
French male cross-country skiers
Olympic cross-country skiers of France
Cross-country skiers at the 1928 Winter Olympics
Place of birth missing
20th-century French people